Gabriel Leite may refer to:
 Gabriel Leite (footballer, born 1995), Brazilian football midfielder
 Gabriel Leite (footballer, born 1987), Brazilian football goalkeeper